Loren David Walensky is an American physician-scientist and pediatric oncologist at the Dana–Farber Cancer Institute since 2003 and a professor of pediatrics at the Dana–Farber/Harvard Cancer Center. He researches peptides and oncogenic pathways. In 2013, Walensky became director of the joint MD/PhD program at Harvard Medical School. He is the husband of Rochelle Walensky, director of the Centers for Disease Control and Prevention.

Education 
Loren David Walensky graduated from Millburn High School, Essex County, New Jersey, in 1986. While in high school, he attended the precollege program of the Manhattan School of Music on a piano scholarship. In 1990, Walensky completed a bachelor's degree in chemistry from Princeton University and a certificate in science policy from the Princeton School of Public and International Affairs. He was the valedictorian. Walensky graduated from Johns Hopkins School of Medicine with a Ph.D. and M.D. in 1997. Walensky completed a residency in pediatrics and a fellowship in pediatric hematology-oncology at Dana-Farber and Boston Children's Hospital.

Personal life 
Walensky married physician-scientist Rochelle Walensky in 1995. They have three sons. They are Jewish and members of Temple Emanuel in Newton, Massachusetts.

References

External links

 

21st-century American physicians
American medical researchers
American pediatricians
American oncologists
Johns Hopkins School of Medicine alumni
21st-century American scientists
Harvard Medical School faculty
Year of birth missing (living people)
Living people
Jewish American scientists
Jewish physicians
Princeton School of Public and International Affairs alumni
21st-century American Jews